Steven John Folkes (30 January 1959 – 27 February 2018) was an Australian professional rugby league footballer and coach of the Canterbury-Bankstown Bulldogs in the National Rugby League. He represented both New South Wales and Australia

Playing career
Folkes, who was Captain of Punchbowl Boys' High School, came from the Bankstown Sports Junior Rugby League Club. He played 245 first grade games and 308 grade games for the Bulldogs between 1978 and 1991, as well as 24 games for Hull F.C. in England.

He also represented New South Wales on nine occasions in State of Origin football. At the end of the 1986 NSWRL season, he went on the 1986 Kangaroo tour of Great Britain and France. He played a total of five Tests between 1986 and 1988. As a player, Folkes played in 6 Grand Finals (1979, 80, 84, 85, 86 and 88) winning on four occasions.

Coaching career
After serving as reserve grade coach of Canterbury between 1996 and 1997, Folkes was appointed coach of Canterbury-Bankstown to succeed Chris Anderson. In his first year as coach, Canterbury made the 1998 NRL grand final, where they lost to Wayne Bennett's Brisbane Broncos.

Canterbury-Bankstown appeared poised to claim the 2002 NRL premiership but were disqualified and stripped 37 premiership points after a major salary cap breach was uncovered. Folkes claimed his premiership two seasons later with a 16–13 victory over the Sydney Roosters in the grand final.

Steve Folkes was awarded Dally M Coach of the Year in 2004.

The 2004 grand final victory continued a unique tradition at the Bulldogs: Every coach appointed by the club since 1978 (Ted Glossop, Warren Ryan, Phil Gould, Chris Anderson and Folkes) has won a premiership. At the end of the 2007 season, Folkes' win record with the Bulldogs was 60%. 
On 7 April 2008, Canterbury-Bankstown announced that Folkes tenure as would end with the 2008 season. To date, he remains the club's longest serving  coach

Following his departure from the Canterbury club, Folkes took up a position as strength and conditioning coach for the West Indies cricket team. In October 2009, Folkes returned to rugby league, accepting the role of strength and conditioning coach for the Wests Tigers. In 2011, he was an assistant coach with the club.

It was announced in May 2011 that Folkes would join the St George Illawarra Dragons as the assistant coach to Steve Price from 2012.

In 2014, Folkes was appointed head coach for the Australia women's national rugby league team.

Personal life 
Folkes was married to Karen, the daughter of Bulldogs 'godfather', Peter Moore. She died on 2 June 2013 from cancer.

Death 
Folkes died at his home on 27 February 2018, reportedly of a heart attack, at the age of 59. An autopsy found that he had been suffering from chronic traumatic encephalopathy, a neurodegenerative disease caused by repeated head injuries.

Coaching record

Footnotes

External links
Canterbury Bulldogs profile
Steve Folkes Official Bulldogs profile

1959 births
2018 deaths
Australia national rugby league team players
Australia women's national rugby league team coaches
Australian rugby league coaches
Australian rugby league players
Canterbury-Bankstown Bulldogs coaches
Canterbury-Bankstown Bulldogs players
Hull F.C. players
New South Wales City Origin rugby league team players
New South Wales Rugby League State of Origin players
Rugby league players from Sydney
Rugby league second-rows